"The Mook, the Chef, the Wife and Her Homer" is the first episode of the eighteenth season of the American animated television series The Simpsons. It first aired on the Fox network in the United States on September 10, 2006. In the episode, Fat Tony is put out of commission by a rival family, and Homer and Bart take over the Springfield Mafia.

The episode was written by Bill Odenkirk and directed by Michael Marcantel. Metallica guest star as themselves, while Michael Imperioli and Joe Pantoliano guest star as Fat Tony's enemies, Dante Jr. and Dante, respectively. In its original broadcast, "The Mook, the Chef, the Wife and Her Homer" was watched by around 11.5 million people and received a 5.3 Nielsen rating. This episode is unavailable for streaming on Disney+ in Singapore.

Plot

After Bart humiliates him in front of Metallica, Otto spanks him, leading to his suspension. With this, Marge has to drive carpool to several of Bart and Lisa's classmates, including Michael, the son of Fat Tony. News of Michael's family spreads, and everyone tries to keep their distance from him. However, Lisa chooses to befriend Michael and discovers that he is a talented cook who dreams of being a chef, rather than going into the family business of "waste management".

When Fat Tony takes a turn driving the children home from school, they find themselves attacked by the Calabresi family, although Fat Tony manages to elude them. Michael then invites the Simpson family over for dinner, but the Calabresis show up unexpectedly for a sit-down. When soufflés are served to the mobsters, they are at first impressed, but the Calabresis go on to mock Michael after he reveals that he was the one who made them. Fat Tony admonishes Michael for making him look weak in front of his enemies before he is suddenly gunned down by an attack helicopter, leaving him comatose.

With no leadership, Johnny Tightlips urges a reluctant Michael to step up as boss, but Homer and Bart volunteer in his place. They then proceed to handle Fat Tony's business, extorting Moe and Krusty, as well as taking several luxury items for themselves. Eventually, Michael notices how the power is corrupting Homer and Bart and seeks to put an end to it.

Michael invites the Calabresis to the Simpsons' house for dinner, where he concedes defeat and states that he is out of the family business. They applaud his decision, but end up choking and dying over their meals. Marge discovers the food had been poisoned, and although Michael appears remorseful, Lisa finds out it was intentional. After Fat Tony congratulates Michael for taking down their enemies, Lisa asks Michael why he did not tell Fat Tony it was all an accident. He then bluntly tells her to never ask him about his business.

Production

The title is a reference to The Cook, the Thief, His Wife and Her Lover. Homer says the greatest mob film of all time was Shark Tale. The 2004 animated film took its general storyline from The Godfather although it transferred the material into a PG-rated animated film. The ending of the episode is a reference  to the ending of The Godfather, including the music. Guest star Michael Imperioli was chosen for his role as Christopher Moltisanti in The Sopranos. The Sopranos intro is played when Fat Tony and his crew drive through Springfield.

Reception
Dan Iverson of IGN wrote that the episode was "charming", and that he enjoyed its parody of The Godfather, praising Pantoliano and Imperioli's appearances. He also wrote that as the episode was too random, he missed the emotional impact it should have had, giving the episode a final rating of 7/10. In 2007, Simon Crerar of The Times listed Metallica's performance as one of the 33 funniest cameos in the history of the show.

References

External links 
 

2006 American television episodes
Metallica
The Sopranos
The Simpsons (season 18) episodes